Prokhladnaya (Russian Прохладная, German Frisching, Polish Świeża) is a river in Kaliningrad Oblast, Russia. It terminates into the Vistula Lagoon.

References

Rivers of Kaliningrad Oblast
Drainage basins of the Baltic Sea